Operation Sustainable Human is a 2019 book by Chris Macdonald about optimised climate action. The book briefly outlines the main challenges of climate change and largely focuses on the most impactful climate solutions.

Tagline 
A four-step scientific guide to combat climate change (high impact made simple)

Publications 
 Macdonald, Chris. Operation Sustainable Human. Illuminate Press. . Paperback edition
 Macdonald, Chris. Operation Sustainable Human. Illuminate Press. . Kindle edition
 Macdonald, Chris. Operation Sustainable Human. Illuminate Press. . Audiobook edition

References 

Climate change
Sustainability
Environment and society
Climate action plans
2019 non-fiction books